Gilles Tonelli (born 27 November 1957) is a Monegasque engineer, diplomat and politician. 

Tonelli served as the Minister of Public Works, the Environment and Urban Development from 2005 to 2006, the Minister of Finance and Economy from 2006 to 2009, and the Minister of Public Works, the Environment and Urban Development from 2009 to 2011. He was the Monegasque Ambassador to Belgium, the Netherlands, Luxembourg, and the European Union between 2011 and 2015. 

Tonelli has served as the Monegasque Minister of Foreign Affairs and Cooperation since November 2016. He has overseen negotiations for more bilateral exchanges between Monaco and the European Union.

Early life
Gilles Tonelli was born on 27 November 1957. He graduated from the École Spéciale des Travaux Publics, and he earned a master of advanced studies degree in mathematics from the University of Nice Sophia Antipolis.

Career
Tonelli began his career as an engineer for SOFRESID (now a subsidiary of Saipem) in Paris in 1983–1984. 

Tonelli worked for the Monegasque Ministry of Public Works and Social Affairs from 1984 to 1993, and he served as its Director-General from 1993 to 1999. He was the Minister of Public Works, the Environment and Urban Development from 2005 to 2006, the Minister of Finance and Economy from 2006 to 2009, and the Minister of Public Works, the Environment and Urban Development from 2009 to 2011. From 2011 to 2015, he was the Monegasque Ambassador to Belgium, the Netherlands, Luxembourg, and the European Union. Tonelli served as the interim Minister of State after Michel Roger fell ill in December 2015, up until Serge Telle was appointed as his successor in February 2016.

Tonelli succeeded José Badia as the Monegasque Minister of Foreign Affairs and Cooperation in February 2015. In a speech at the Headquarters of the United Nations in October 2015, he reiterated Monaco's fight against extremist violence and money laundering as well as ethnic cleansing and genocide. Since November 2016, he has also begun negotiations for an agreement between Monaco and the European Union to enable Monegasque subjects to work and study in E.U. countries, not just France. However, he has stated that Monaco will not join the European Economic Area or the European Union.

Tonelli is the former president of the Monaco Nautical Society and the Monegasque Rowing Federation.

Honours

National honours
:
 Officer of the National Order of Legion of Honour
 Officer of the National Order of Merit

:
 Officer of the Order of Saint-Charles

Personal life
Tonelli is married, and he has three children.

References

1957 births
Living people
Ambassadors of Monaco to Belgium
Monegasque politicians
Côte d'Azur University alumni
Finance ministers of Monaco
Foreign ministers of Monaco
Commanders of the Order of Saint-Charles
Ambassadors of Monaco to the Netherlands
Ambassadors of Monaco to Luxembourg
Ambassadors of Monaco to the European Union